Anolis brianjuliani is a species of lizard in the family Dactyloidae. The species is found in Mexico.

References

Anoles
Endemic reptiles of Mexico
Reptiles described in 2019
Taxa named by Gunther Köhler